Old Bodney Camp is a  biological Site of Special Scientific Interest west of Little Cressingham in  Norfolk. It is part of the Breckland Special Protection Area.

This area of heath is maintained by rabbit grazing. It has some areas of grassland and others dominated by lichen and moss. There are two nationally rare moths, Noctua orbona and Scopula rubiginata, which are almost confined to the Breckland region.

The site is private land with no public access.

References

Sites of Special Scientific Interest in Norfolk
Hilborough